Pelegri, Pelegrí, or Pélégri are surnames. Notable people with these surnames include:
Assimina Pelegri (born 1968), Greek-American materials scientist
Francis Pelegri (born 1952), French rower
Jean Pélégri (1920–2003), French-Algerian writer and academic
Maria Teresa Pelegrí i Marimón (1907–1996), Spanish composer
Óscar Pelegrí (born 1994), Spanish cyclist
Xavier Pelegrí (born 1981), Spanish footballer

See also
Pelegrí Clavé (1811–1880), Spanish painter